Welsh is a town in Jefferson Davis Parish, Louisiana. The population was 3,226 at the time of the 2010 census. It is part of the Jennings Micropolitan Statistical Area.

History
Welsh was originally a homestead owned by former plantation overseer and Confederate States Army soldier Henry Welsh in the late 1800s. In 1881, Welsh donated right-of-way and a section house to the Southern Pacific Railroad on the condition that trains stop in the town. The town of Welsh was platted in 1880 and incorporated on March 15, 1888, when Henry Welsh was elected the first mayor. Initially part of the Old Imperial Calcasieu Parish, in 1913 Welsh became part of the newly established Jefferson Davis Parish.

Geography
Welsh is located at  (30.237419, -92.820593).

According to the United States Census Bureau, the town has a total area of 6.3 square miles (16.4 km), of which 6.2 square miles (16.1 km) is land and 0.1 square mile (0.3 km) (1.89%) is water.

Demographics

As of the 2020 United States census, there were 3,333 people, 1,128 households, and 765 families residing in the town.

Notable people
 Canray Fontenot (1922–1995), Creole fiddler
 Phillip Walker (1937–2010), electric blues guitarist and singer
 Charles Mann, swamp pop legend and member of the Louisiana Music Hall of Fame

Education
Jefferson Davis Parish Public Schools operates public schools in Welsh. Schools serving Welsh include Welsh Elementary School (PK–5) in Welsh, Welsh - Roanoke Jr. High (6–8) in nearby Roanoke, and Welsh High School (9–12) in Welsh.

Jefferson Davis Parish Library operates the McBurney Memorial Branch at 301 South Sarah Street.

References

Towns in Louisiana
Towns in Jefferson Davis Parish, Louisiana